Joris Vanspringel (born 8 February 1963 in Turnhout, Belgium) is a Belgian Olympic eventing rider. Representing Belgium, he competed at four Summer Olympics (in 2004, 2008, 2012 and 2016). He placed 7th in team eventing in 2004. Meanwhile, his current best individual Olympic placement is 24th place from 2016.

Vanspringel also participated at the 2014 World Equestrian Games and at six European Eventing Championships (in 2003, 2007, 2009, 2011, 2013 and 2015). He won a team bronze at the 2009 Europeans held in Fontainebleau, France. His current best individual finish is 9th place from 2007.

Joris Vanspringel is a full-time station master.

CCI 4* Results

References

Belgian male equestrians
1963 births
Olympic equestrians of Belgium
Equestrians at the 2004 Summer Olympics
Equestrians at the 2008 Summer Olympics
Equestrians at the 2012 Summer Olympics
Equestrians at the 2016 Summer Olympics
Living people
Sportspeople from Turnhout
21st-century Belgian people